Nicholas Frances Chase (born Nebeil Mahayni; 1966 in Roseburg, Oregon) is an American composer and performer.

Chase received a Bachelor of Arts in German Area Studies from University of Oregon in 1993 and studied music composition at the California Institute of the Arts (CalArts) with Stephen Mosko, Morton Subotnick, Bunita Marcus, and Mary Jane Leach, receiving his Master of Fine Arts in 2000. At CalArts he studied Hindustani Classical Music with Rajeev Taranath and Arabic Classical Music with Dr. Ziad Bunni.

His compositional style references popular music forms such as techno, electronica, ambient, and noise music, and frequently integrates interactive signal processing and electronic sound material with acoustic instrumentation. He has written original music for various ensembles including the California EAR Unit, the Long Beach Opera, and the Philadelphia Classical Symphony.

Performances 
Chase performs using a laptop and DJ turntables and is known to integrate video projection into performances. In 2008 he began performing his own compositions for solo piano, giving concerts in Europe and the US.

Visual work 
Chase has directed short films, usually with a strong musical element. In 2008 he created video projections for an event affiliated with the Whitney Biennial. His musical scores are known for their graphical presentation and have been recognized as works of visual art.

Awards
In 2000, the same year he received his M.F.A., Chase was awarded CalArts' President's Alumni Achievement Award. He was nominated for the Alpert Award in Music in 2003. In 2011 Chase received a Composer Fellowship from Other Minds Festival in San Francisco, the inaugural year of the Composer Fellow program.

Works
e1>3ktr=Δ (Opera, 2000)
Sp!t (2000)
Tw!tch (2000)
Rugosa Rose (2001)
OPUS (2002)
22 (Opera, 2003)
Woad for Indigo (2004)
11 Ideas (Film, 2005)
Seventh Sense (2005)
Ouistitis (2007)
Considering Light (2008)
Ngoma Lungdundu (Voice That Thunders) (2008)
Songs of the Thirsty Sword (2008)
Blue Sky Over Buchenwald (Sound Track, 2008)
Street Mix No. 1 (2010)
Gin Blossoms & Broccoli Boutonnières (2011)
Solifuge (2011)
Bone Totem Dog (2011)
Des (2011)
Bhajan (2012)
Voluptuous (2012)
Bone Strung (2012)
Saida (2013)
Gapayati (2014)

Partial discography
Songs About Edgar Allan Poe (Bright Green Records, USA 1995)
Collaborations (DVD, STV/Unit Records, Switzerland 2006)
Bhajan (Cold Blue Music, USA 2017)

References

External links
Official website
Nicholas Chase Biography at the American Music Center website

Living people
21st-century classical composers
American electronic musicians
Electroacoustic music composers
Avant-garde keyboardists
American contemporary classical composers
People from Roseburg, Oregon
University of Oregon alumni
California Institute of the Arts alumni
1966 births
21st-century American musicians
Male classical composers
21st-century American male musicians